Patrick J Fox, Ph.D., P.E., D.GE, F.ASCE (born 1962), an American civil engineer, is currently the John A. and Harriette K. Shaw Professor and Head of the Department of Civil and Environmental Engineering at The Pennsylvania State University, a  specialist in geotechnical and geoenvironmental engineering. He obtained a Ph.D. in civil and environmental engineering from the University of Wisconsin–Madison in 1992 .

Fox served on the Board of Governors for the Geo-Institute of the American Society of Civil Engineers (ASCE) from 2014 to 2021 and as president of the Geo-Institute in 2020.  He served as Editor and then Editor-in-Chief of the ASCE Journal of Geotechnical and Geoenvironmental Engineering from 2007 to 2015, and is a member and past chair of the Technical Publications Committee of the ASCE Geo-Institute.  He also has served on the editorial boards for Geotextiles and Geomembranes, Geosynthetics International, and the International Journal of Geomechanics.  Starting in 2021, he has been Editor for Geosynthetics International.

His research awards include the Arthur Casagrande Professional Development Award from ASCE, Thomas A. Middlebrooks Award (twice) from ASCE, IGS Award (twice) from the International Geosynthetics Society, Chandrakant S. Desai Medal and John Booker Medal from the International Association for Computer Methods and Advances in Geomechanics (IACMAG), and best paper awards from the Geotechnical Testing Journal, Geosynthetics International (twice), and the International Journal of Geomechanics (three times).

Fox is a licensed professional engineer, Diplomat of Geotechnical Engineering from the Academy of Geo-Professionals (AGP), and Fellow of ASCE.

References 

1962 births
Living people
American civil engineers
Pennsylvania State University faculty
University of Wisconsin–Madison alumni
Place of birth missing (living people)